Jeffrey Patrick Kaiser (born July 24, 1960) is an American former Major League Baseball pitcher. Kaiser attended Aquinas High School in Southgate, Michigan where he was teammates with Paul Assenmacher. He played college baseball at Western Michigan University, winning a school record 25 games. He never pitched more than 15 games or 16.2 innings in a major league season. He finished his career with an ERA of 9.17 in 50 games.

References

Sources

1960 births
Living people
People from Wyandotte, Michigan
Major League Baseball pitchers
Oakland Athletics players
Cleveland Indians players
Detroit Tigers players
Cincinnati Reds players
New York Mets players
Medford A's players
Modesto A's players
Albany-Colonie A's players
Tacoma Tigers players
Buffalo Bisons (minor league) players
Colorado Springs Sky Sox players
Toledo Mud Hens players
Denver Zephyrs players
Norfolk Tides players
Indianapolis Indians players
Western Michigan Broncos baseball players
Baseball players from Michigan